Eli Maor (born 1937), an historian of mathematics, is the author of several books about the history of mathematics. Eli Maor received his PhD at the Technion – Israel Institute of Technology. He teaches the history of mathematics at Loyola University Chicago. Maor was the editor of the article on trigonometry for the Encyclopædia Britannica.

Asteroid 226861 Elimaor, discovered at the Jarnac Observatory in 2004, was named in his honor. The official  was published by the Minor Planet Center on 22 July 2013.

Selected works
 To Infinity and Beyond: A Cultural History of the Infinite, 1991, Princeton University Press. 
 e:The story of a Number, by Eli Maor, Princeton University Press (Princeton, New Jersey) (1994) 
 Venus in Transit, 2000, Princeton University Press. 
 Trigonometric Delights, Princeton University Press, 2002 . Ebook version, in PDF format, full text presented.
 The Pythagorean Theorem: A 4,000-Year History, 2007, Princeton University Press, 
 The Facts on File Calculus Handbook (Facts on File, 2003), 2005, Checkmark Books, an encyclopedia of calculus concepts geared for high school and college students

References 
 

Israeli mathematicians
Israeli historians
Historians of mathematics
Living people
Loyola University Chicago faculty
Technion – Israel Institute of Technology alumni
1937 births